Jon Scieszka (born September 8, 1954) is an American children's writer, best known for his picture books created with the illustrator Lane Smith. He is also a nationally recognized reading advocate, and the founder of Guys Read – a web-based literacy program for boys whose mission is "to help boys become self-motivated, lifelong readers."

Scieszka was the first U.S. National Ambassador for Young People's Literature, appointed by the Librarian of Congress for calendar years 2008 and 2009.

His Time Warp Trio series, which teaches kids history, has been adapted into a television show.

Personal life

Scieszka was born in Flint, Michigan in 1954, the second oldest among six sons of Shirley Scieszka, and Louis Scieszka, a former elementary school principal. He attended Culver Military Academy in Indiana for high school, Albion College in Michigan where he studied English and pre-med. for his B.A., and Columbia University for a Master of Fine Arts in fiction writing.

Scieszka currently lives in Park Slope, Brooklyn with his wife, an interior designer. His children live in the neighborhood as well.

After graduating, Scieszka worked in a variety of capacities: teaching at an elementary school (mostly second grade), writing for magazines, and painting apartments.

Professional life
While pursuing his MFA at Columbia in New York, Scieszka painted apartments. He went on to teach 1st-8th grade at the Day School (currently the Trevor Day School) for ten years. After that, he started writing and touring full-time, which he still does today.

According to Scieszka, he writes books because he "loves to make kids laugh." Most of his best-known works were written in conjunction with illustrator Lane Smith. Among their collaborations are The Stinky Cheese Man and Other Fairly Stupid Tales, The True Story of the 3 Little Pigs! and Math Curse. He is also the author of the Time Warp Trio series, for which Smith illustrated eight of the sixteen books. The series has been made into a television show. The design of many Scieszka and Smith collaborations, including Stinky Cheese Man, is attributed to Molly Leach, Smith's wife.

Scieszka is also the founder of Guys Read, a web-based literacy program for boys whose mission is "to help boys become self-motivated, lifelong readers." He founded the nonprofit in response to his experiences as an elementary school teacher and the United States National Assessment of Educational Progress statistics showing boys consistently scoring worse than girls on federal reading tests every year, at every grade level.

In 2008 Scieszka was named the nation's first National Ambassador for Young People's Literature by the Librarian of Congress. During his two years as Ambassador, it was his job to raise "national awareness of the importance of young people’s literature as it relates to lifelong literacy, education and the development and betterment of the lives of young people." For Scieszka, this meant traveling to schools, libraries, and book-related conferences to speak about engaging kids in reading through choice, an expanded definition of reading, positive role models, and embracing new technologies. He has joked that being an ambassador gets him out of parking tickets.

Books 
Scieszka has written and edited many books for various publishers.

Picture books
 The True Story of the 3 Little Pigs!, illustrated by Lane Smith - Harper & Row - 1989 
 The Frog Prince, Continued, illustrated by Steven Johnson - Viking Press - 1991
 The Stinky Cheese Man and Other Fairly Stupid Tales - Viking Press - 1992 
 The Book That Jack Wrote, illustrated by Dan Adel - Viking Press - 1994 (out of print)
 Math Curse, illustrated by Lane Smith - Viking Press - 1995 
 Squids Will Be Squids, illustrated by Lane Smith - Viking Press - 1998
 Baloney, (Henry P.), illustrated by Lane Smith - Viking Press - 2001
 Science Verse, illustrated by Lane Smith - Viking Press - 2004
 Seen Art?, illustrated by Lane Smith - Viking Press- 2005
 Cowboy and Octopus, illustrated by Lane Smith - Viking Press - 2007
 Walt Disney’s Alice In Wonderland, illustrated by Mary Blair - Disney Press - 2008
 Robot Zot, illustrated by David Shannon - Simon & Schuster - 2009

Series

The Time Warp Trio
Also see The Time Warp Trio

The Time Warp Trio books are illustrated middle grade novels about three boys, Sam, Joe, and Fred, who travel through time and space with a magical book. The early books were illustrated by Lane Smith, and later ones by Adam McCauley. They are published by Viking Press.

 Knights of the Kitchen Table, illustrated by Lane Smith- 1991
 The Not-so-Jolly Roger, illustrated by Lane Smith - 1991
 The Good, The Bad, And The Goofy, illustrated by Lane Smith - 1992
 Your Mother Was A Neanderthal, illustrated by Lane Smith - 1993
 2095, illustrated by Lane Smith - 1995
 Tut Tut, illustrated by Lane Smith - 1996
 Summer Reading Is Killing Me, illustrated by Lane Smith - 1998
 It's All Greek to Me, illustrated by Lane Smith - 1999
 See You Later, Gladiator, illustrated by Adam McCauley - 2000
 Sam Samurai, illustrated by Adam McCauley - 2001
 Hey Kid, Want to Buy A Bridge?, illustrated by Adam McCauley - 2001
 Viking It and Liking It, illustrated by Adam McCauley - 2002
 Me Oh Maya, illustrated by Adam McCauley - 2003
 Da Wild, Da Crazy, Da Vinci, illustrated by Adam McCauley - 2004
 Oh Say, I Can't See, illustrated by Adam McCauley - 2005
 Marco? Polo!, illustrated by Adam McCauley - 2005

Jon Scieszka - Time Warp Trio Lyrics

Trucktown
Scieszka was inspired to create the Trucktown series because he "really wanted to write something for all of those crazy little guys who didn’t think there was something out there for them to read."

The Trucktown characters and backgrounds were created by the team of David Shannon, Loren Long, and David Gordon. The over fifty-book Trucktown program includes picture books, "Ready-to-Roll" early reader books, board books, and a variety of activity books. They are published by Simon & Schuster Children's Publishing.

A TV series with the same name was produced by Nelvana and it premiered on Treehouse TV in Canada on September 6, 2014, it was also available to stream as part of Nickelodeon's NOGGIN streaming service.

Picture Books:

 Smash! Crash! - 2008
 Melvin Might? - 2008
 Truckery Rhymes - 2009

Ready-to-Roll:

 Snow Trucking! - 2008
 Pete's Party - 2008
 Uh-Oh Max - 2008
 Zoom! Boom! Bully - 2009
 Melvin's Valentine - 2009
 The Spooky Tire - 2009
 Kat's Mystery Gift - 2009
 Trucksgiving - 2010
 Dizzy Izzy - 2010
 Trucks Line Up - 2011

Spaceheadz
Spaceheadz is a multi-platform story, told through four books, multiple websites, integrated blogs, social media sites, videos, ads, and user-created content. The story reveals how three aliens from the planet Spaceheadz disguise themselves as 5th graders in Brooklyn in order to sign up 3.14 million and 1 Earthlings to be Spaceheadz and save Earth. The extensive online storytelling is managed by Casey Scieszka and Steven Weinberg. The books are illustrated by DreamWorks animator Shane Prigmore, and published by Simon & Schuster Children's Publishing.

 Spaceheadz Book #1!, illustrated by Shane Prigamore with Francesco Sedita - 2010
 Spaceheadz Book #2!, illustrated by Shane Prigamore with Casey Scieszka and Steven Weinberg - 2010
 Spaceheadz Book #3!, illustrated by Shane Prigamore with Casey Scieszka and Steven Weinberg - 2011
 Spaceheadz Book #4!, illustrated by Shane Prigamore with Casey Scieszka and Steven Weinberg  - 2013

Frank Einstein
The Frank Einstein books are illustrated middle grade (3-7) novels about a kid-genius scientist and inventor named Frank Einstein.

 Frank Einstein and the Antimatter Motor, illustrated by Brian Biggs - Abrams/Amulet, 2014
 Frank Einstein and the Electro-Finger, illustrated by Brian Biggs - Abrams, 2015
 Frank Einstein and the BrainTurbo, illustrated by Brian Biggs - Abrams, 2015
 Frank Einstein and the EvoBlaster Belt, illustrated by Brian Biggs - Abrams, (forthcoming September 2016)
 Frank Einstein and the Bio-Action Gizmo, illustrated by Brian Biggs - Abrams, 2017
 Frank Einstein and the Space-Time Zipper, illustrated by Brian Biggs - Abrams, 2018

Memoir/novel
 Knucklehead: Tall Tales and Mostly True Stories of Growing Up, Scieszka - Viking Press - 2008

Contributor
 Guys Write for Guys Read, "Brothers" - Viking - 2005
 Puffin Classics edition of Swiss Family Robinson, "Introduction" - Puffin Classics - 2009
 Half-Minute Horrors, "Whispers" - HarperCollins - 2009
 Guys Read: Funny Business, "Your Question for Author Here," with Kate DiCamillo - Walden Pond Press - 2010
 The Chronicles of Harris Burdick: Fourteen Amazing Authors Tell the Tales, "Under The Rug," illustrated by Chris Van Allsburg - Houghton Mifflin - 2011

Editor
 Guys Write for Guys Read - Viking Press - 2005
 Guys Read: Funny Business, contributors: Mac Barnett, Patrick Carman, Christopher Paul Curtis, Kate DiCamillo, Paul Feig, Jack Gantos, Jeff Kinney, David Lubar, Adam Rex - Walden Pond Press - 2010
 Guys Read: Thriller, contributors: M.T. Anderson, Gennifer Choldenko, Matt de la Peña, Margaret Peterson Haddix, Bruce Hale, Jarrett J. Krosoczka, Anthony Horowitz, Walter Dean Myers - Walden Pond Press - 2011
 Guys Read: Sports Pages, contributors: Dustin Brown, James Brown, Joseph Bruchac, Chris Crutcher, Tim Green, Dan Gutman, Gordon Korman, Chris Rylander, Anne Ursu, Jacqueline Woodson, with illustrations by Dan Santat - Walden Pond Press - 2012
Guys Read: Other Worlds, contributors: Rick Riordan, Tom Angleberger, D. J. MacHale, Rebecca Stead, Ray Bradbury, Shaun Tan, Neal Shusterman, Shannon Hale, Kenneth Oppel, Eric S. Nylund, with illustrated by Greg Ruth - 2013
Guys Read: True Stories, contributors: Jim Murphy, Elizabeth Partridge, Nathan Hale, James Sturm, Candace Fleming, Douglas Florian, Sy Montgomery, Steve Sheinkin, T. Edward Nickens, Thanhha Lai - 2014
Guys Read: Terrifying Tales, contributors: Adam Gidwitz, R.L. Stine, Dav Pilkey, Michael Buckley, Claire Legrand, Nikki Loftin, Adele Griffin, Kelly Barnhill, Lisa Brown, Daniel José Older, Rita Williams-Garcia, with illustrations by Gris Grimly - 2015
Guys Read: Heroes & Villains, contributors: Christopher Healy, Sharon Creech, Cathy Camper, Laurie Halse Anderson, Ingrid Law, Deborah Hopkinson, Pam Muñoz Ryan, Eugene Yelchin, Jack Gantos, Lemony Snicket - 2017

Awards and recognition
Scieszka was named the first U.S. National Ambassador for Young People's Literature by the Library of Congress for 2008–2009. He received the annual University of Southern Mississippi Medallion for lifetime contribution to children's literature in 2013.

Two children's books written by Scieszka and illustrated by Lane Smith  were ranked among the 100 best all-time picture books in a 2012 survey published by School Library Journal: The True Story of the Three Little Pigs, number 35, and The Stinky Cheese Man, 91.

Scieszka's books have received many awards and other recognitions, including:

 1989: The New York Times Book Review, Best Books of the Year citation, The True Story of the 3 Little Pigs!
 1989: American Library Association, Notable Children's Book citation, The True Story of the 3 Little Pigs!
 1989: Maryland Black-eyed Susan Picture Book Award, The True Story of the 3 Little Pigs!
 1989: Parenting Reading Magic Award, The True Story of the 3 Little Pigs!
 1992: The New York Times Book Review, Best Illustrated Books of the Year citation, The Stinky Cheese Man and Other Fairly Stupid Tales
 1992: School Library Journal Best Books of the Year citation, The Stinky Cheese Man and Other Fairly Stupid Tales
 1992: Booklist, Children's Editors' Top-of-the-List citation, The Stinky Cheese Man and Other Fairly Stupid Tales
 1992: American Library Association, Notable Children's Book citation, The Stinky Cheese Man and Other Fairly Stupid Tales
 1994: Rhode Island Children's Book Award, The Stinky Cheese Man and Other Fairly Stupid Tales
 1995: Best Children's Book citation, Math Curse
 1995: Bulletin of the Center for Children's Books, Blue Ribbon citation, Math Curse
 1995: Booklist, Top-of-the-List and Editors' Choice citations, Math Curse
 1995: Publishers Weekly, Best Children's Book,  Math Curse
 1996: American Library Association, Best Books for Young Adults citation, Math Curse
 1997: Golden Archer Award, The Stinky Cheese Man and Other Fairly Stupid Tales
 1997: Maine's Student Book Award, Math Curse
 1997: Texas Bluebonnet Award,  Math Curse
 1997: New Hampshire The Great Stone Face Book Award, Math Curse
 1999: National Education Association, Kids' Top 100 Books, The True Story of the 3 Little Pigs!
 2001: Los Angeles Times Book Review, Best Books of the Year citation, Baloney, (Henry P.)
 2001: Reading Magic Award, Parenting magazine, Baloney, (Henry P.)
 2001: The New York Times Book Review, Notable Books, Baloney, (Henry P.)
 2001: Reading Magic Awards, Parenting magazine Baloney, (Henry P.)
 2002: Notable Children's Books in the Language Arts, Baloney, (Henry P.)
 2002: Golden Duck Awards for Excellence in Children's Science Fiction Literature, Baloney, (Henry P.)
 2004: Parent's Choice Award, Gold, Non-Fiction, Science Verse
 2005: American Library Association, Notable Children's Book Award, Science Verse
 2005: Golden Duck Awards for Excellence in Children's Science Fiction Literature, Science Verse
 2009: Bank Street Best Books of the Year, Robot Zot
 2009: Irma S. Black Award, Honor Book, Robot Zot
 2009: The New York Times Book Review, Bestseller, Robot Zot

On writing
In his autobiography, Knucklehead: Tall Tales and Almost True Stories of Growing Up Scieszka, he writes that his inspiration for much of his work comes from the "strange things" that happened to him while growing up with his brothers.

Scieszka creates outlines for the books of his Time Warp Trio series for structural reasons. When writing other books, however, he says, "Anything goes. Middle first, sometimes end, sometimes title, sometimes punchline."

References

External links 

 
 
 

1954 births
Living people
American children's writers
American people of Polish descent
Albion College alumni
Culver Academies alumni
Writers from Flint, Michigan
Reading skill advocates
Columbia University School of the Arts alumni